Khandker Nurul Habib is a Bangladeshi-Canadian engineer and academic. He was born in Narayanganj, Bangladesh, and later moved to Canada. He is the 5th of 6 children of Abdur Razzaque Khandker and Salma Khandker. Currently, he is a tenured Full Professor at the University of Toronto's Department of Civil & Mineral Engineering. He was also the endowed 'Percy Edward Hart Professor':2019-2022 at the University of Toronto. Professor Khandker Nurul Habib completed his Ph.D. in Civil Engineering at the University of Toronto ( CIV Ph.D. 0T7 ). After finishing his Ph.D., he joined the University of Alberta as an assistant professor in civil engineering. He worked for the University of Alberta from 2008 to 2010 and was responsible for rebuilding the graduate program in transportation engineering. He moved to Toronto to join his Alma Mater in 2010. He also served his first Alma Mater, the Bangladesh University of Engineering and Technology (BUET), for 3 years between 2000 and 2003 as a lecturer and an assistant professor of civil engineering. Currently, he is leading the research programs in sustainable transportation planning, demand modeling, and travel survey methods (the Travel Demand Modelling Group: TDMG) at the University of Toronto Transportation Research Institute (UTTRI) civil engineering department. Professor Nurul Habib has extensive research and consulting experience in transportation engineering and planning. His overall research focus is the sustainable transportation planning and policy development. For this, he recognizes that we need a clear understanding of peoples' transportation behavior and appropriate methodology for capturing such behavior while forecasting demand for transportation infrastructure or results of any transportation and land use policies. He is the current chair (2021-2024) of the Standing Committee on Traveler Behavior and Values (AEP30) of the Transportation Research Board (TRB), National Academies of Science, Engineering and Medicine (NASEM), USA.

 and specializes in transportation engineering and planning.

Selected publications

References

External links

Academic staff of the University of Toronto
University of Toronto alumni
Academic staff of the University of Alberta
Bangladesh University of Engineering and Technology alumni
Transport engineers
Year of birth missing (living people)
Living people